Loricariichthys acutus is a species of catfish in the family Loricariidae. It is native to South America, where it is known only from Brazil. The species reaches 28 cm (11 inches) in standard length, can weigh up to at least 91.6 g, and is believed to be a facultative air-breather.

References 

Loricariidae
Fish described in 1840
Catfish of South America